The Glory Guys is a 1965 American Western film directed by Arnold Laven and written by Sam Peckinpah, based on the 1956 novel The Dice of God by Hoffman Birney. Filmed by Levy-Gardner-Laven and released by United Artists, it stars Tom Tryon, Harve Presnell, Senta Berger, James Caan, and Michael Anderson Jr.

Plot
Though a fictionalized Western based on George Armstrong Custer's 7th Cavalry Regiment at the Battle of the Little Big Horn, the film is almost a generic war story covering the enlistment, training, and operational deployment of a group of recruits that could take place in any time period. The main plot follows two cavalry soldiers under the command of a tough general who fight Plains Indians and fall for the same woman.

Production
Arnold Laven hired Sam Peckinpah to write the script in 1956 after having been impressed by some of Peckinpah's scripts for Gunsmoke. Although it took a number of years for Laven to raise finance for the movie, the quality of the script led to Laven working with Peckinpah in television.

Peckinpah later called the film "a total disaster because of the casting. All the people in the picture were good. That is, they’ve all been good in other pictures but they didn’t really belong in that one. It was a wretched film. And one of the reasons I’ve made up my mind not to write any more. But I was on the street. I had to write."
 
The film was known as Custer's Last Stand. When 20th Century Fox announced they would make The Day Custer Fell they were worried about competing with a big budget film so they changed the script and made all the characters fictitious. Sam Peckinpah, fresh from making Major Dundee (1965), was considered to direct the film, but he was passed over in favor of Arnold Laven.

The titles were drawn by Joseph Mugnaini for Format Productions. Cover version's of the title song were done by Al Caiola and sung by Frankie Laine.

Cast
Tom Tryon as Capt. Demas Harrod
Harve Presnell as Scout Sol Rogers
Senta Berger as Lou Woddard
Michael Anderson Jr. as Trp. Martin Hale
James Caan as Trp. Anthony Dugan
Slim Pickens as Sgt. James Gregory
Erik Holland as Trp. Clark Gentry
Adam Williams as Trp. Lucas Crain
Andrew Duggan as Gen. Frederick McCabe
Peter Breck as Lt. Bunny Hodges
Laurel Goodwin as Beth Poole
Jeanne Cooper as Mrs. Rachael McCabe
Robert McQueeney as Maj. Oliver Marcus
Wayne Rogers as Lt. Mike Moran
Michael Forest as Fred Cushman
Claudio Brook as Rev. Poole (scenes deleted)

Reception
Filmink magazine said the film was "an attempt to do a John Ford Western, specifically Fort Apache... with Caan playing, of all things, the Victor McLaglen role as an Irish sergeant, when he clearly should have had the lead instead of Tom Tryon" adding if Peckinpah had "directed, this film would be famous and most probably good instead of being forgotten, like all Arnold Laven movies."

See also
List of American films of 1965

Notes

External links

1965 films
Films based on American novels
Films based on Western (genre) novels
Western (genre) cavalry films
1965 Western (genre) films
United Artists films
American Western (genre) films
Films directed by Arnold Laven
Films shot in Mexico
Films scored by Riz Ortolani
Revisionist Western (genre) films
1960s English-language films
1960s American films